Nicholas, Bishop of the Isles may refer to:

Nicholas I (bishop of the Isles) (fl. 1147×1152)
Nicholas II (bishop of the Isles) (died 1217)
Nicholas de Meaux (fl. thirteenth century)